The structure of the St John Passion, BWV 245, a sacred oratorio by Johann Sebastian Bach, is "carefully designed with a great deal of musico-theological intent". Some main aspects of the structure are shown in tables below.

The original Latin title  translates to "Passion according to John".
Bach's large choral composition in two parts on German text, written to be performed in a Lutheran service on Good Friday, is based on the Passion, as told in two chapters from the Gospel of John ( and ) in the translation by Martin Luther, with two short interpolations from the Gospel of Matthew (in the earliest version, one is from the Gospel of Matthew and one from the Gospel of Mark). During the vespers service, the two parts of the work were performed before and after the sermon. Part I covers the events until Peter's denial of Jesus, Part II concludes with the burial of Jesus. The Bible text is reflected in contemporary poetry and in chorales that often end a "scene" of the narration, similar to the way a chorale ends most Bach cantatas. An anonymous poet supplied a few texts himself, quoted from other Passion texts and inserted various stanzas of chorales by nine hymn writers. Bach led the first performance on 7 April 1724 in Leipzig's . He repeated it several times between 1724 and 1749, experimenting with different movements and changing others, which resulted in four versions (with a fifth one not performed in Bach's lifetime, but representing the standard version). The Passion, close to Bach's heart, has an "immediate dramatic quality".

Structure

Text

Gospel 

The gospel account by John narrates the story in five "scenes".

Part I
 Arrest (1–5), Kidron Valley
 Denial (6–14), palace of the high priest Kaiphas

Part II
 Court hearing with Pontius Pilate (15–26) ( and )
 Crucifixion and death (27–37), Golgotha
 Burial (38–40), burial site

Some musicologists regard movement 24 as the conclusion of scene 3, the aria "" which locates the action from the courthouse to Golgotha, the calvary. Others, including Alfred Dürr, regard the scene as ending with the last comment by Pilate.

Bach incorporated two short interpolations from the Gospel of Matthew (in Version I, one from Matthew and one from the Gospel of Mark),  after John 18:27, describing the weeping of Peter, and  after John 19:30, describing the tearing of the temple curtain (in Version I, this was replaced by ). The narrator is the Evangelist, a tenor. Jesus and all other male characters are sung by a bass (including Peter and Pilate) or tenor (servant); female characters (such as the Maid) are sung by a soprano, while the people who are often summarily called  (the Jews), the servants of the High Priest, and the soldiers are sung by a four-part chorus (SATB) in dramatic  movements. The "immediate, dramatic quality" of the "kind of musical equivalent of the Passion Play" relies on the setting of the interaction between the historical persons (Jesus, Pilate, Peter, Maid, Servant) and the crowd ("soldiers, priests, and populace").

Chorales 

At eleven moments in the Passion, stanzas from Lutheran chorales reflect the narration. Possibly Bach had an influence on their selection. He set them all in common time for four parts, the instruments playing colla parte with the voices.

Five chorales conclude a scene (in movements 5, 14, 26, 37 and 40); while a chorale opens Part II (15). Five chorales comment within a scene (3, 11, 17, 22, 28), including the central movement (22). One chorale accompanies the bass soloist in an aria (32).

Most chorale texts were written in the 16th and 17th century, by authors of the Reformation such as Martin Luther, Martin Schalling and Michael Weiße, and by hymn writers including Paul Gerhardt and Johann Heermann. The central chorale is not part of a common hymn, its text being taken from a libretto by Christian Heinrich Postel.

Contemporary text 

The third source for the text is contemporary poetry that reflects the biblical narration. It was compiled by an unknown author, who partly used existing text: from the Brockes Passion (Hamburg, 1712 and 1715) by Barthold Heinrich Brockes, he copied the text for movements 7, 19, 20, 24, 32, 34, 35 (partly) and 39; he found movement 13 in Christian Weise's  (Leipzig, 1675) and took from Postel's  (c. 1700) movements 19 (partly), 22 and 30.

Scoring 

The work is scored for vocal soloists (soprano, alto, tenor and bass), a four-part choir SATB, and an orchestra of two flauto traverso (Ft) (except for Version I, since all evidence of Bach's use of traverse flutes point to the 2nd Cantata Cycle as when he first used them), two oboes (Ob), two oboes da caccia (Oc), two oboes d'amore (Oa), two violins, viola (Va), and basso continuo. Bach added some instruments which were already old-fashioned at the time in arias for special effects, such as the archlute (Version I and 1739-1749 revision only, replaced by Organ and/or Harpsichord), the viola d'amore and the viola da gamba (Vg). Bach did not differentiate the vox Christi (voice of Christ), singing the words of Jesus, from the other bass recitatives and arias, nor the evangelist from the tenor arias.

Symmetry 

The work displays a thoughtful symmetry. In the center of the five parts is the court hearing which confronts Jesus, Pilate, and the people. In the middle of the hearing, a chorale (22) interrupts the argument, which is a discussion about freedom and captivity. It is surrounded by two choral movements, which not only both ask for the crucifixion of Jesus, but also use the same musical motifs, the second time intensified. Again, in a repetition of similar musical material, a preceding  choir explains the law, while a corresponding movement reminds Pilate of the Emperor whose authority is challenged by someone calling himself a king. Preceding this, Jesus is greeted in mockery as a king, corresponding in motif to the later request that Pilate should change the inscription saying he is "the King of the Jews" to "He said: I am the King of the Jews".

Versions 

Part I was performed before the sermon, Part II after the sermon. Bach performed a second version on Good Friday a year later, 30 March 1725. Other versions were performed between 1728 and 1732 (version 3), and in 1749 (version 4). A final, fifth version, revised between 1739 and 1749, was never performed in Bach's lifetime.

In version 2, Bach opened with a chorale fantasia on "" (O man, bewail thy sins so great), the first stanza of a 1525 hymn by Sebald Heyden, a movement which he ultimately used to conclude Part I of his St Matthew Passion, returning to the previous chorus  in later versions of the St John Passion. He used three alternative arias, one of them with a chorale sung by the choir, and replaced the two closing movements, the chorus  and the chorale  with the chorale fantasia on "" (Christ, you Lamb of God), the German , published in Braunschweig in 1528. Bach took this movement from his cantata , which had been an audition piece for his post in Leipzig. Before, it had been part of his Weimarer Passion of 1717.

In version 3, after Bach wrote his St Matthew Passion, he returned the opening chorus  and the final chorus  to their initial position, but removed the Gospel passages from Matthew and the closing chorale.

In version 5 (never performed), possibly dating from as early 1739, Bach returned to the first version, but revised it thoroughly. He began a new score which covers 12 movements. As Christoph Wolff observes: "The fragmentary revised score constitutes an extensive stylistic overhaul with painstaking improvements to the part-writing and a partial restructuring of the instrumentation; particular attention was paid to the word-setting in the recitatives and the continuo accompaniment." In 1749, Bach performed the St John Passion once more, in an expanded and altered form from the 1724 version, in what would be his last performance of a Passion.

Wolff writes: "Bach experimented with the St John Passion as he did with no other large-scale composition", possible by the work's structure with the Gospel text as its backbone and interspersed features that could be exchanged. Wolff concludes: "the work accompanied Bach right from his first year as Kantor of St Thomas's to the penultimate year of his life and thus, for that reason alone, how close it must have been to his heart.

Overview 

In the following, the movement numbers are those of the NBA, version I, unless otherwise noted.

The chorales in detail 

The first chorale, movement 3, is inserted after Jesus tells the crowd to arrest him, but let his disciples go. "" (O mighty love, O love beyond all measure) is stanza 7 of Johann Heermann's 1630 hymn "". In personal reflection, the speaker sees the contrast of his pleasure in the world and the suffering of Jesus, ending in a short "" (And you must suffer). 

The second chorale, movement 5, ends the first scene, after Jesus remarks that he has to be obedient. "" (Your will be done, Lord God, alike) is stanza 4 of Luther's 1539 hymn ", a paraphrase of the Lord's Prayer.

The third chorale, movement 11, is inserted after Jesus asks those who are beating him for justification. Two stanzas from Paul Gerhardt's 1647 hymn "" comment the scene, stanza 3, "" (Who has you now so stricken), and stanza 4, "" (I, I and my transgressions), highlighting the personal responsibility of the speaking sinner for the suffering of Jesus.

The fourth chorale, movement 14, ends the second scene and Part I. After Peter's denial, "" (Peter, when he fails to think) summarizes the scene with stanza 10 of Paul Stockmann's 1633 hymn "".

The fifth chorale, movement 15, opens Part II and the third scene. "" (Christ, who has made us blessed), stanza 1 of Michael Weiße's 1531 hymn, summarizes what Jesus has to endure, even though he is innocent ("made captive, ... falsely indicted, and mocked and scorned and bespat").

The sixth chorale, movement 17, comments in two more stanzas from "Herzliebster Jesu" (3), after Jesus addresses the different people of his kingdom. Stanza 8, "" (Ah King so mighty, mighty in all ages) reflects  the need for thanksgiving and stanza 9 the inability to grasp it, "" (I cannot with my reason ever fathom).

The seventh chorale, movement 22, is the central movement of the whole Passion, which interrupts the conversation of Pilate and the crowd by a general statement of the importance of the passion for salvation: "" (Through your prison, Son of God, must come to us our freedom) is not part of a known hymn, but the text of an aria from a St John Passion by Postel from around 1700.

The eighth chorale, movement 26, ends the scene of the court hearing, after Pilate refuses to change the inscription. "" (Within my heart's foundation) is stanza 3 of Valerius Herberger's 1613 hymn "".

The ninth chorale, movement 28, is related to Jesus telling his mother and John to take care of each other. "" (He of all did well take heed) is stanza 20 of Stockmann's hymn (14).

The tenth chorale, movement 32, is part of the bass aria which follows immediately after the report of the death of Jesus. "" (Jesus, you who suffered death, now live forever) is the final stanza of Stockmann's hymn (14).

The eleventh chorale, movement 37, ends the scene of the crucifixion. "" (O help, Christ, Son of God) is stanza 8 of Weiße's hymn (15).

The twelfth chorale, movement 40, ends the Passion. "" (Ah Lord, let your own angels dear) is stanza 3 of Martin Schalling's 1569 hymn "".

Tables of movements 

The following tables give an overview of all versions of the Passion, first performed in 1724. Two variants of movement numbering are given, first that of the Neue Bach-Ausgabe (NBA), then that of the Bach-Werke-Verzeichnis (BWV). Voices appear in one of three columns, depending on the text source: Bible, contemporary poetic reflection, or chorale. The instrumentation is added, using abbreviations for instruments, followed by key and time signature, and the NBA number of a corresponding movement within the work's symmetry.

Version I 

There are no extant Flute parts for this version, so the movements that normally require them have violins instead. This was performed in 1724. The Bach Compendium lists it as BC D 2a

Part I

Part II

Version II 

For this version (of 1725), in addition to the Flute parts (which were first used in late 1724 (after 1. Sunday after Trinity), Bach heavily revised both text and music. He added five movements from his Weimarer Passion, with three texts now thought to be by Christoph Birkmann. This is listed as BC 2b.

Part I

Part II

Version III 

In this version, Bach reverted to the original layout (thus discarding the previous revisions and additions). However, he decided to compose a true St John Passion, and thus eliminated the material inserted from the Gospel of Matthew. Now 12c ends in Measure 31 and Movement 33 is eliminated altogether (replaced by a lost Sinfonia). He also dispensed with the Lute and the Viola d'amore, replacing them with an Organ and Violini con sordino. It was possibly performed in 1728 and definitely in 1732. This is listed as BC D 2c.

Part I

Part II

Standard Version (1739-1749)

Essentially a reworking of the 1724 Version, this version is the most detail-oriented revision of the work. On 17 March 1739, while still working on this revision, Bach was informed that the performance of the Passion setting could not go ahead without official permission, thus (most likely) effectively halting any plans for that year. In response, Bach performed the Brockes-Passion of his friend, Georg Philipp Telemann (TVWV 5:1). However, though he had stopped at measure 42 of Movement 10, he continued to work on this revision, as shown by the copyists' score and parts. It is listed as BC D 2e.

Part I

Part II

Version IV

Essentially a re-production of Version I with a few alterations (text changes in Movements 9, 19 & 20, instrumentation reflective of Version III). It was performed in 1749 and (most likely) repeated in 1750. It also represents (outside of the St Matthew Passion) the largest instrumental ensemble used (calling for 3 1st Violins), and (for the first time in his work) calls for a Contrabassoon (used in all choral parts, as well as instrumental ritornellos). It is listed as BC D 2d.

Part I

Part II

References

Sources

Scores

Books

Online sources

Further reading

External links 
 
 
 
 

Passions and oratorios by Johann Sebastian Bach

de:Johannes-Passion (J. S. Bach)#Werkübersicht
fr:Passion selon saint Jean#Structure générale